XHNI-FM is a radio station on 105.1 FM in Nogales, Sonora, Mexico. The station is known as Estéreo Genial and carries a grupera format.

History
XHNI received its concession on June 22, 1979. It is co-owned with XENY-AM.

References

Radio stations in Sonora
Radio stations established in 1979